A nibble (or nybble), in computing, is a four-bit unit of data.

Nibble, nibbles, nibbler, or nibblers may also refer to:

Print media
Nibble (magazine), a former publication for Apple II computer users
Nibbles, a 20th-century American comic written by Malcolm Hancock

Film and television
Nibbles (film), a 2004 Canadian animated short by Christopher Hinton
Nibbles (Tom and Jerry), also known as Tuffy, a cartoon mouse character in the Tom and Jerry series, and Jerry's younger cousin
Nibbler (Futurama), a fictional character from the animated television series

Computing and games
Nibbler (video game), an arcade game
Nibbles (video game), a simple video game and variant of Snake
Nibblers (video game),  a mobile tile-matching puzzle video game about fishes

Other uses
Nibbles, various small items of finger food
Nibbler, or nibblers, a tool for cutting sheet metal with minimal distortion
Nibbles Woodaway, alternate name of the Big Blue Bug, the giant termite mascot of New England Pest Control

See also

 Nibble fish, or doctor fish
 Bite (disambiguation)
 Bit (disambiguation)